"'Til the Day I Started Lovin' You" was a hit for Dalton & Dubarri in 1979. It was the follow up to their hit, "I (You) Can Dance All By My (Your) Self".

Background
The song is taken from Dalton & Dubarri's 1979 album Choice which was released on Hilltak Records  HT 1102. It was written and produced by Dalton and Dubarri. The single cat#PW 7902 is backed with "Keepin' It Up".
It appears on the 1994 Valley Vue various artist compilation, Soul Searchin' . They followed up with "Flyin' Free".

Chart performance
"'Til the Day I Started Lovin' You" reached No. 76 on the Billboard R&B singles chart in September 1979, spending five weeks on the chart.

Charts

References

External links
 Soul Years Music Portal ,   Dalton & Dubarri ~ "'Til the Day I Started Lovin' You" 
 Dynaero - releases
 kuromara:Dalton & Dubarri / Choice ('79)

1979 singles
Dalton & Dubarri songs
Songs written by Gary Dalton
Songs written by Kent Dubarri
Hilltak Records singles